The 1975 All-Ireland Senior Football Championship Final was the 88th All-Ireland Final and the deciding match of the 1975 All-Ireland Senior Football Championship, an inter-county Gaelic football tournament for the top teams in Ireland.

On the train to Dublin, Kerry manager Mick O'Dwyer and his players spoke to journalists. Jim Farrelly quoted O'Dwyer in the Sunday Independent as advocating a marriage ban for his players. "Marriage puts players back in their game". Kerry player Jimmy Deenihan was photographed during the train trip alongside his sister Patricia and said to Farrelly: "Four of us [Kerry players] are PE teachers. Saying 'no' to girls and drink and high Kerry social life has been hard!".

John Egan and substitute Ger O'Driscoll scored goals for a surprise win.

Yet it was no surprise. The train trip (above) revealed the inaccuracy of the callow reputation in which Kerry often indulged. And ahead of the game Dublin were 4/5, Kerry 5/4 in the betting odds.

This was the second of four All-Ireland football titles won by Kerry in the 1970s.	

Séamus McCarthy, aged 21 and later a Tipperary footballer, and his 50-year-old father Eddie McCarthy, became the first father-and-son pair to umpire at an All-Ireland final, doing so at the Hill 16 end of Croke Park.

References

All-Ireland Senior Football Championship Final
All-Ireland Senior Football Championship Final, 1975
All-Ireland Senior Football Championship Finals
All-Ireland Senior Football Championship Finals
Dublin county football team matches
Kerry county football team matches